Marzenin may refer to the following places:
Marzenin, Greater Poland Voivodeship (west-central Poland)
Marzenin, Łódź Voivodeship (central Poland)
Marzenin, Lubusz Voivodeship (west Poland)